Hemimarginula pumila, the pygmy ermarginula,  is a species of sea snail, a marine gastropod mollusk in the family Fissurellidae, the keyhole limpets.

Description
The whitish to pale brownish conical shell is 6 to 13 mm long on a broadly oval base with an irregularly scalloped margin. The height is variable and the shell is usually much depressed. The apex is nearly centrally located. There is a narrow exhalant slit at the front margin. There are about twelve broad ribs that are minutely scabrous. These ribs are crossed by three buff, radiating bands. The radiating ribs are distant and corrugated. The interstices are deeply latticed and corrugated.

Distribution and habitat
This keyhole limpet is fairly common and can be found on or under rocks in tide pools, shallow water and in the intertidal to the sublittoral zone (from 2m to 27 m deep) along the coasts of Southeastern Florida south to Brazil. They can also be found living on mangrove oysters.
This species occurs in the following locations:
 Aruba
 Belize
 Bonaire
 Caribbean Sea
 Cayman Islands
 Colombia
 Cuba
 Curaçao
 Gulf of Mexico
 Hispaniola
 Jamaica
 Lesser Antilles
 Mexico
 Panama
 Puerto Rico

References

 Fischer-Piette, E., 1950. Listes des types décrits dans le Journal de Conchyliologie et conservés dans la collection de ce journal. Journal de Conchyliologie 90: 8-23
 Fischer, P., 1857. Description d'espèces nouvelles. Journal de Conchyliologie 5: 355-356
 Rosenberg, G., F. Moretzsohn, and E. F. García. 2009. Gastropoda (Mollusca) of the Gulf of Mexico, Pp. 579–699 in Felder, D.L. and D.K. Camp (eds.), Gulf of Mexico–Origins, Waters, and Biota. Biodiversity. Texas A&M Press, College Station, Texas

External links
 To World Register of Marine Species
 Manual of conchology, structural and systematic : with illustrations of the species / by George W. Tryon, Jr. p. 268, Philadelphia :Published by the Author, Academy of Natural Sciences,1879-1898.

Fissurellidae
Gastropods described in 1852